The 2013 Western Athletic Conference baseball tournament was held beginning May 22 and ending on May 26.  The top eight regular season finishers of the league's ten teams met in the round-robin tournament held at QuikTrip Park in Grand Prairie, Texas.   won their first tournament championship and earned the Western Athletic Conference's automatic bid to the 2013 NCAA Division I baseball tournament.  UTSA departed for Conference USA after the 2013 season, again leaving the conference with no team that had ever won the tournament for 2014.

Seeding and format
The top eight finishers from the regular season were seeded based on conference winning percentage.  They were divided into two groups of four, which played a round robin format.  The winners of each group then played a single championship game.

Results
All times shown are US CDT.  If 2 teams tie in pool play, the head-to-head winner advances to the final.

Division A

Division B

Championship final

All-Tournament Team
The following players were named to the All-Tournament Team.

Most Valuable Player
Matt Sims was named Tournament Most Valuable Player.  Sims was a pitcher for UTSA.

References

Western Athletic Conference Baseball Tournament
Western Athletic Conference baseball tournament
Tournament
Baseball in the Dallas–Fort Worth metroplex